Jonas Sandell (born 12 February 1995) is a Norwegian and Swedish  ski jumper.

He represented Sweden at the FIS Nordic World Ski Championships 2015 in Falun.

References

External links 
 

1995 births
Living people
Swedish male ski jumpers